Abdullah Al-Salam (born 3 April 1995) is a Saudi Arabian handball player for Mudhar and the Saudi Arabian national team.

References

1995 births
Living people
Saudi Arabian male handball players
Place of birth missing (living people)
21st-century Saudi Arabian people